HMS L55 was a British L class submarine built by Fairfield Shipbuilding and Engineering Company, Govan, Clyde. She was laid down on 21 September 1917 and was commissioned on 19 December 1918.

In 1919 L55 was sunk in the Baltic Sea by Bolshevik vessels while serving as part of the Allied intervention in the Russian Civil War. The submarine was raised in 1928 and repaired by the Soviets. After being used for training, she finally was scrapped in the 1950s.

British service 
HMS L55 was based at Tallinn, Estonia as part of the Baltic Battle Squadron which was supporting the Baltic states fighting for independence. HMS L55 missed her targets and was forced into a British-laid minefield. Soviet sources stated Azard sank her by gunfire. If she was sunk by gunfire, L55 was the only British submarine sunk by hostile Soviet vessels.

Salvage 
The wreck was found by Soviet minesweepers in 1927. The Soviets raised her on 11 August 1928. The crew was buried in a communal grave at the Haslar Royal Naval Cemetery in Portsmouth on 7 September 1928.

Soviet service 
The boat was rebuilt by Baltic Works, Leningrad, the reconstruction cost of 1 million roubles being financed by a public fund as "an answer to Chamberlain". She was recommissioned as a Soviet submarine with the same number (Л-55) on 7 August 1931. She was later named Bezbozhnik ("Atheist") and was used as the basis of design for the Soviet L-class submarines. L55 was used for training until the beginning of World War II, when she was damaged in an accident in early 1941. She was scrapped in 1953 or possibly 1960.

Notes

Bibliography

External links 
 "Л-55", former British Type L III Series 
 V.V. Balabin, English Submarine under the flag of the USSR 
https://www.britishpathe.com/video/home-is-the-sailor-home-from-the-sea

British L-class submarines
Ships built in Govan
1918 ships
World War I submarines of the United Kingdom
Captured ships
Lost submarines of the United Kingdom
Foreign submarines of the Soviet Navy
Royal Navy ship names

Soviet Union–United Kingdom relations
Maritime incidents in 1919
Maritime incidents in 1941
Shipwrecks in the Gulf of Finland
Submarines sunk by Soviet warships